Yaysky District is an administrative district (raion), one of the nineteen in Kemerovo Oblast, Russia. As a municipal division, it is incorporated as Yaysky Municipal District. It is located in the north of the oblast. Its administrative center is the urban locality (an urban-type settlement) of Yaya. Population:  24,982 (2002 Census);  The population of Yaya accounts for 57.3% of the district's total population.

References

Notes

Sources

Districts of Kemerovo Oblast